The Zereh (Persian زره) is an Iranian vessel. It has advanced automated missiles and artillery. The battleship is of the Paykan-class rocket launchers.

History
The Zereh is a Sina-class (or Kaman-class) fast attack craft, which is an upgrade of France's Combattante II missile vessels. The Zereh has four MTU MD 16V 538 TB90 engines that deliver 12,000 horsepower. This vessel can attain a top speed of 36 knots (67 km/h; 41 mph).

A ceremony was held on 13 January 2021 to introduce the new Zereh warship. The warship is 47 meters long and 15 meters high. It has a 76mm cannon in the bow, a 40mm anti-aircraft cannon in the stern, and a 300 km Qadir surface-to-surface missile system.

Specifications
The Zereh (F235) warship is armed with a 76mm OTO-Melara automatic weapon and a Bofors 40 mm/70 automatic cannon. It also has a license-produced replica of the Chinese C-802 anti-ship missile, which is an enhanced version of the Chinese YJ-8 anti-ship missile.

The Zereh missile frigate is 47 meters long, 7.1 meters wide, and 15 meters high.
Their displacement tonnage ranges from 275 to 300 tonnes. The warship also has four 140 kW power generators that produce electricity for diverse uses.

Armaments
The primary weapon of the Zereh is the 76 mm 'Fajr 27', with a maximum range of 17 km, 12 km against surface targets, and 7 km against air targets.
It also has the 'Fatah 40', a 40 mm cannon with a range of 4 km against air targets, 6 km against sea and ground targets, and an ultimate range of 12 km.

References

 

Ship classes of the Islamic Republic of Iran Navy
Missile boats of the Islamic Republic of Iran Navy
Ships built at Iranian Naval Factories
Missile boats of Iran